The Coming Jobs War is a book by Gallup Chairman Jim Clifton.

Clifton claims that a lack of innovation is not the problem, but rather a lack of entrepreneurship.

Reviews
Deepak Chopra wrote that The Coming Jobs War is "excellent and timely" and Charles M. Blow in the New York Times commenting the book is "fascinating – and frightening."

References

2011 non-fiction books
Business books